This was the first edition of the tournament.

Malek Jaziri won the title after defeating Blaž Rola 7–6(7–5), 6–1 in the final.

Seeds

Draw

Finals

Top half

Bottom half

References
Main Draw
Qualifying Draw

Qujing International Challenger - Singles